The UEFA Second Round was contested by the best eight runners-up from the nine first round groups from the UEFA segment of the qualification tournament for the 2014 FIFA World Cup in football. The winners — Croatia, France, Greece, and Portugal — of each of four home and away ties joined the group winners in the World Cup in Brazil. The matches, which are often referred to as 'play-offs', were held on 15 and 19 November 2013.

The draw for the ties was held in Zürich on 21 October, with the October 2013 FIFA World Rankings used to decide which of the teams would be seeded.

Qualified teams
The eight best runners-up from the UEFA First Round qualified for the play-offs; with one group having one team fewer than the others, matches against the sixth-placed team in each First Round group did not count for this ranking. As a result, eight matches played by each team counted for the purposes of ranking the runners-up (below table).

Ranking of second-placed teams
The eight best runners-up were determined by the following parameters in this order:
 Highest number of points
 Goal difference
 Highest number of goals scored

Seeding and draw
The second round draw took place at the headquarters of FIFA in Zurich on 21 October at 14:00 UTC+2. October 2013 FIFA World Rankings were used to decide which of the teams would be seeded (shown below in brackets).

The following teams participated in the second round:

Matches
The draw was conducted by Gordon Savic, Head of FIFA World Cup Qualifiers, with the assistance of former Switzerland international Alexander Frei.
The matches were played on 15 and 19 November 2013.

|}

Portugal won 4–2 on aggregate and qualified for the 2014 FIFA World Cup.

France won 3–2 on aggregate and qualified for the 2014 FIFA World Cup.

Greece won 4–2 on aggregate and qualified for the 2014 FIFA World Cup.

Croatia won 2–0 on aggregate and qualified for the 2014 FIFA World Cup.

Discipline

Goalscorers 
4 goals
  Cristiano Ronaldo

3 goals
  Kostas Mitroglou

2 goals
  Mamadou Sakho
  Zlatan Ibrahimović

1 goal

  Mario Mandžukić
  Darijo Srna
  Karim Benzema
  Dimitris Salpingidis
  Bogdan Stancu
  Andriy Yarmolenko
  Roman Zozulya

Own goals
  Vasilis Torosidis (playing against Romania)

References

External links
Results and schedule (FIFA.com version)
Results and schedule (UEFA.com version)

play-off
Play
Play
2013–14 in Ukrainian football
playoff
2013–14 in Romanian football
Playoff
2013 in Swedish football
2013 in Icelandic football
November 2013 sports events in Europe
November 2013 sports events